David Acevedo (born 20 February 1937) is an Argentine former footballer who played as a defender for Argentina in the 1958 FIFA World Cup. He also played for Club Atlético Independiente.

Honours
Copa Libertadores: 1964, 1965
Argentine Primera División: 1960, 1963, 1967 Nacional,

References

External links
 
 David Acevedo at BDFA.com.ar 

1937 births
Argentine footballers
Argentina international footballers
Association football defenders
Club Atlético Independiente footballers
1958 FIFA World Cup players
Living people
Footballers from Santa Fe, Argentina